A Manji (Punjabi: ਮੰਜੀ ਪ੍ਰਥਾ ) was a Sikh religious administrative unit for the propagation of Sikhism towards men. It was part of the Sikh missionary administrative organization founded by Guru Amar Das, the third Guru of Sikhism. Manji refers to each zone of religious administration with an appointed chief called sangatias, with officially appointed representatives known as a masand. It had been conceptually similar in its aims to the diocese system in Christianity, and had been similarly important in Sikh missionary activity.

The word Manji or Manja literally means a cot (taken as the seat of authority in this context).

A similar administrative unit existed for women. It was known as a Piri and was part of the Piri system.

Guru Amar Das divided the Sikh congregation areas into twenty-two Manjis. He appointed a local preacher to be in-charge of each of the Manjis. For this purpose, a large group of 146 followers were trained for the propagation of Sikhism. 94 of them were men and assigned to a Manji  whilst 52 were women and assigned to a Piri.

See also
 Sikh Gurus
 Masand
 Piri System

References

History of Sikhism
Sikh politics
Sikh communities
Sikh terminology